The U.S. Post Office is a former post office building located at 107 W. Main St. in Albertville, Alabama. The post office was built in 1931; while files at the post office claim it was a Works Progress Administration building, the organization did not exist in 1931. The two-story brick building has a mansard-styled roof with a green slate exterior and dormers on the front and rear. The front entrance has a single-story portico supported by Doric columns. The building's roof line features a frieze, cornice, boxed eaves, and a parapet with a balustrade.  It was listed on the National Register of Historic Places in 1983.

See also 
List of United States post offices

References 

Federal architecture in Alabama
Albertville
Government buildings completed in 1931
National Register of Historic Places in Marshall County, Alabama